Love Stinks  may refer to:

Love Stinks (film), 1999
"Love Stinks", an episode of Frasier
"Love Stinks", an episode of Bump in the Night
"Love Stinks", a 2-part episode of 7th Heaven
Love Stinks (album), The J. Geils Band 1980 
"Love Stinks" (song), The J. Geils Band 1980